Letart Falls is an unincorporated community in Meigs County, in the U.S. state of Ohio.

History
A post office called Letart Falls was established in 1826, and remained in operation until 1959. There were formerly falls on the Ohio River at this point.

References

Unincorporated communities in Meigs County, Ohio
Unincorporated communities in Ohio